Sunayana is a 1979 Bollywood family drama film directed by Hiren Nag and produced by Tarachand Barjatya.

Cast
Talluri Rameshwari as Sunayana
Vijayendra Ghatge as Dr. Indrajeet
Naseeruddin Shah as Rajoo
Gayatri 
Sulochana Latkar 
Jagdeep
Pinchoo Kapoor 
Leela Mishra 
Mukri 
Rajendra Nath

Soundtrack
Soundtrack for this film has been composed and written by Ravindra Jain.
 "Sunayana" – K. J. Yesudas
 "Aanso Bhi Hain"– K. J. Yesudas
 "Megha O Re Megha" – Hemlata
 "Kaisi Hoon Main" – Hemlata

References

External links
 

1979 films
1970s Hindi-language films
1979 comedy films
Rajshri Productions films
Films scored by Ravindra Jain